Lara Jean Chorostecki is a Canadian actress known for her role as Fredricka "Freddie" Lounds in the American psychological thriller–horror television series Hannibal, and as Sergeant Krystina Breeland on the critically acclaimed Canadian series X Company.

Early life
Chorostecki was born in Brampton, Ontario, and attended Mayfield Secondary School. Chorostecki's father worked in a bank and her mother was a French teacher. She is of Polish and Scottish descent. She has a brother.

Career 
Chorostecki became interested in acting after seeing Les Misérables when she was eight years old. She performed at the Stratford Festival for a number of years. Chorostecki was the youngest ever person to be accepted into the Birmingham Conservatory for Classical Theatre Training in Stratford, Ontario. She earned a Masters in Classical Acting in London, England at The Royal Central School of Speech and Drama.

Early in her career, Chorostecki had series regular roles in the Starz series Camelot and the Canadian comedy Dan for Mayor as well as a recurring role in The Listener and the BBC America series Copper.

In 2013, Chorostecki starred in the Canadian romantic comedy film Please Kill Mr. Know It All. She plays journalist Fredricka "Freddie" Lounds in the NBC drama Hannibal.

In 2014, Chorostecki began filming a series regular role on the CBC World War II drama X Company, where she plays Sergeant Krystina Breeland.

In 2016, Chorostecki was cast in the recurring role of Beth MacLeish on the ABC political drama series Designated Survivor, which premiered in the fall of the same year.

In 2018, she starred in the Canadian drama Nose to Tail, alongside Aaron Abrams.

Filmography

Film

Television films

Television series

Awards and nominations

References

External links 
 
 

1984 births
Living people
21st-century Canadian actresses
Actresses from Ontario
People from Brampton
Canadian film actresses
Canadian people of Polish descent
Canadian people of Scottish descent
Canadian television actresses